The Bastille was a prison in France.

Bastille may also refer to:

Places and structures
Bastille (fortification), a form of urban fortification
In Paris:
Bastille (Paris Métro), a railway station of the Paris Métro
Gare de la Bastille, a former railway station in Paris
Opéra Bastille, an opera house in Paris
Place de la Bastille, a square in Paris where the Bastille prison once stood
Bastille (Grenoble), a fortress in Grenoble, France
Bastille Peak, a mountain in Nunavut, Canada
Beuzeville-la-Bastille, a commune in Basse-Normandie, France

People
Guillaume Bastille, a Canadian short-track speed skater

Arts and entertainment
Bastille (band), a British indie band
Bastille (film), a Dutch film
Siege of the Bastille (Cholat), a painting by Claude Cholat

History
Storming of the Bastille, an event in the French Revolution
Governor of the Bastille, a list of commanders of the Bastille
Operation Bastille, an operation in Iraq

Other uses
Grenoble-Bastille cable car, a French cable car

See also
Bastille Day (disambiguation)